Salmon–Challis National Forest is located in east central sections of the U.S. state of Idaho. At 4,235,940 acres (6,618.66 sq mi, or 17,142.24 km2) it is one of the largest national forests in the lower 48 states and also has most of the land area of the Frank Church–River of No Return Wilderness, which is the largest wilderness area south of Alaska.

Borah Peak, the tallest mountain in Idaho, is also found here. The Wild and Scenic Salmon River weaves through the rugged terrain of the Sawtooth Mountains and Sawtooth National Recreation Area, while it flows for over  through the forest. The Big Lost River has its headwaters within the national forest.

Challis National Forest, the more southerly of its two parts, lies primarily in Custer County, but also has major areas in Lemhi and Butte counties, as well as smaller areas in Clark and Blaine counties. It has a total area of 2,463,471 acres (3,849.17 sq mi, or 9,969.31 km2). There are local ranger district offices located in Challis, Clayton, and Mackay.

Salmon National Forest, which lies to the north, is primarily located in Lemhi County, with spillover into Valley and Idaho counties. It has a total area of 1,772,469 acres (2,769.48 sq mi, or 7,172.93 km2). There are local ranger district offices located in Leadore, North Fork, and Salmon.

The combined forest headquarters are located in Salmon, Idaho.

Wilderness areas

There are two officially designated wilderness areas within Salmon–Challis National Forest that are part of the National Wilderness Preservation System. Both extend into neighboring National Forests or onto lands of the Bureau of Land Management.
 Frank Church—River of No Return Wilderness (partly in Payette NF, Boise NF, Bitterroot NF, Nez Perce NF, or BLM land). The Salmon–Challis NF is the largest component (39.59%) of this wilderness if they are considered as one forest; otherwise, if the Challis NF and the Salmon NF are considered separately, the Payette NF (33.45%) becomes the largest component.
 Jim McClure–Jerry Peak Wilderness (most is managed by Salmon–Challis National Forest, while part is managed by the Bureau of Land Management)
 Sawtooth Wilderness (only about 5.5% of this wilderness lies with Salmon–Challis NF; most of it lies within Boise NF; part of it lies within Sawtooth NF; all of it is managed by Sawtooth National Forest)

References

External links
 
 Salmon–Challis National Forest federal website

National Forests of Idaho
National Forests of the Rocky Mountains
Protected areas of Custer County, Idaho
Protected areas of Lemhi County, Idaho
Protected areas of Butte County, Idaho
Protected areas of Clark County, Idaho
Protected areas of Blaine County, Idaho
Protected areas of Valley County, Idaho
Protected areas of Idaho County, Idaho